In American folklore, a teakettler is a creature with origins in lumberjack culture, specifically the lumber camps of Minnesota and Wisconsin. It is part of a group of related entities collectively as Fearsome Critters. It is said to resemble a small stubby legged dog with the ears of a cat. Its name comes from the sound it makes, which is akin to that of a boiling tea kettle. It only walks backwards, and steam issues from its mouth as it makes its whistle. As the myth goes, only a few lumberjacks have seen one, as they are very shy, but if a boiling kettle is heard and nowhere to be found, it is sure that a Teakettler is nearby.

An account is given by Jorge Luis Borges under "Fauna of the United States" in Book of Imaginary Beings (1957).

References

Fearsome critters